Rached Merdassi (Arabic: رشيد المرداسي) is a Tunisian boxer who has won the Africa Games 2007 at welterweight

Career
At the AllAfrica Games he beat Ghanaian puncher Bastir Samir in the final.

At the Olympic qualification he was disqualified against Joseph Mulema from Cameroon.

References
AllAfrica
2008 qualifier

Living people
Welterweight boxers
Tunisian male boxers
African Games gold medalists for Tunisia
African Games medalists in boxing
Year of birth missing (living people)
Competitors at the 2007 All-Africa Games
21st-century Tunisian people